The Rolling Stones had eleven concert tours in 1965.

Band 
 Mick Jagger – lead vocals, harmonica
 Keith Richards – guitar, backing vocals
 Brian Jones – guitar, harmonica, backing vocals
 Bill Wyman – bass guitar, backing vocals
 Charlie Watts – drums, percussion

Irish tour

The Rolling Stones' Irish tour was the first concert tour of Northern Ireland and Ireland by The Rolling Stones. The tour commenced on 6 January and concluded on 8 January 1965.

Irish tour dates

Far East tour

The Rolling Stones' Far East tour was the first concert tour of Oceania by the band. The tour commenced on 22 January and concluded on 16 February 1965.

This series of concerts was a package tour with Roy Orbison and The Newbeats, and was promoted by Harry M. Miller. In Australia, there were different local support acts in each city.

Parts of the Sydney leg of the tour were filmed by Movietone News and screened in cinemas. Footage in Stones Roll Down Under included their arrival at Sydney Airport, part of the airport press conference and part of the performance of "Not Fade Away" from their first Sydney show.

Far East tour dates

1st British tour

The Rolling Stone]' 1st British tour was a concert tour by the band. The tour commenced on 5 March and concluded on 18 March 1965.
Parts of the Liverpool (6 March) and Manchester (7 March) shows were recorded for Got Live If You Want It!, the third official EP by The Rolling Stones.

1st British tour dates

1st European tour

The Rolling Stones' 1st European Tour was the first concert tour of Scandinavia by the band. The tour commenced on 26 March and concluded on 2 April 1965.

1st European tour dates

2nd European tour

The Rolling Stones' 2nd European tour was the first concert tour of France by the band. The tour commenced on 16 April and concluded on 18 April 1965.

2nd European tour dates

1st American tour

The Rolling Stones' 1st American tour of 1965 was actually their third American tour, having toured the US twice in 1964. This tour included their first concert dates in Canada. The tour commenced on 23 April and concluded on 29 May 1965. On this tour, the band supported their album The Rolling Stones, Now!.

1st American tour dates in 1965.

3rd European tour

The Rolling Stones' 3rd European tour was a concert tour by the band. The tour commenced on 15 June and concluded on 29 June 1965.

3rd European tour dates

2nd Irish tour

The Rolling Stones' 2nd Irish Tour was a concert tour by the band. The tour commenced on 3 September and concluded on 4 September 1965.

This concert tour was documented by the documentary film Charlie Is My Darling.

2nd Irish tour dates

4th European tour

The Rolling Stones' 4th European Tour was a concert tour by the band. The tour commenced on 11 September and concluded on 17 September 1965.

4th European tour dates

2nd British tour

The Rolling Stones' 1965 2nd British Tour was a concert tour by the band. The tour commenced on 24 September and concluded on 17 October 1965.

2nd British tour dates

2nd American tour

The Rolling Stones' 2nd American Tour in 1965 was actually the Rolling Stones 4th American tour, having toured twice in 1964 and once earlier in 1965. The tour commenced on 29 October and concluded on 5 December 1965. On this tour, the band supported their album Out of Our Heads.

2nd American tour dates

References 

 Carr, Roy.  The Rolling Stones: An Illustrated Record.  Harmony Books, 1976.  

The Rolling Stones concert tours
1965 concert tours